Aggeraspis is an extinct genus of arthrodire placoderm fish, which lived during the Early Devonian period in Europe.

References

Placoderms of Europe
Phlyctaeniidae